Laurence Davis (13 September 1930 – 29 March 1974) was a South African cricketer. He played in two first-class matches for Eastern Province in 1950/51.

See also
 List of Eastern Province representative cricketers

References

External links
 

1930 births
1974 deaths
South African cricketers
Eastern Province cricketers
People from Benguela Province